Hayes and Harlington may refer to:
the former Hayes and Harlington Urban District in west Middlesex, England, from 1930 to 1965
Hayes and Harlington (UK Parliament constituency), a constituency in Greater London in the House of Commons of the UK Parliament
Hayes & Harlington railway station, a railway station in Hayes and Harlington in the London Borough of Hillingdon